Fuṣṣilat (fuṣṣilat  "are distinctly explained" or "explained in detail"), also known as Sūrat Ḥā Mīm as-Sajdah, is the 41st chapter (surah) of the Qur'an with 54 verses (āyāt).

Regarding the timing and contextual background of the believed revelation  (asbāb al-nuzūl), it is an earlier "Meccan surah", which means it is believed to have been revealed in Mecca, rather than later in Medina.

Summary
1-3 The Quran declared to be given by inspiration
3-4  The people generally reject it
5  Muhammad only a man, yet a prophet
6-7  The woe of the wicked and the blessedness of the righteous
8-11  God’s power manifested in the creation of earth and heaven
12-16  The Quraish are threatened with the fate of Ád and Thamúd
17  Believers among the Ádites and Thamúdites were saved
18-22  In the judgment the unbelievers shall be condemned by the members of their own bodies
23-24  The fate of the genii to befall the infidels
25-28  Unbelievers counsel blasphemous levity—their punishment
29  False teachers to be trodden under foot by their own followers in hell
30-32  The glorious rewards of the faithful
33  The consistent Muslim commended
34-35  Evil to be turned away by good
36  God the refuge of the Prophet against Satan’s suggestions
37 ۩ 39  God’s works testify to himself as alone worthy of worship
40  Unbelievers shall not escape in the resurrection
41-42  The Quran a revelation of God
43  The infidels offer no new objections to Muhammad and the Qurán
44  Why the Quran was revealed in the Arabic language
45  The books of Moses at first rejected by his people
46  God rewardeth according to works
47  The hour of the judgment known only to God
47-48  The false gods will desert their worshippers in the judgment
49-51  The perfidy of hypocrites
52-54  Rejecters of God’s Word exposed to awful punishment

Q41:12 Revelation
Regarding Revelation in Islam (Waḥy) The word awha occurs in a number of shades of meaning in the Quran, each of them indicating the main underlying idea of directing or guiding someone or something. For example, "And inspired in each heaven its command" (Fussilat-12). Translator Sam Gerrans notes that the use of waḥī and awḥā throughout the Quran contains an element of the imperative, and thus translates: "And instructed each heaven in its command".

References

External links
Quran 41 Clear Quran translation
Sūrat Fuṣṣilat Encyclopaedia of the Qurʾān

Q41:1, 50+ translations, islamawakened.com

Fussilat